The Richards Hill Residential Historic District is located in Watertown, Wisconsin.

Description
The district includes the Octagon House and the neighborhood that grew surrounding it. It was added to the State Register of Historic Places in 2012 and to the National Register of Historic Places the following year.

References

Historic districts on the National Register of Historic Places in Wisconsin
National Register of Historic Places in Jefferson County, Wisconsin